Jaka Štromajer (born 27 July 1983) is a Slovenian footballer who plays for Izola as a forward.

Honours
Koper
Slovenian Cup: 2014–15

References

External links
Stats from Slovenia at NZS 

1983 births
Living people
People from Domžale
Slovenian footballers
Association football forwards
NK Triglav Kranj players
NK Domžale players
FC Koper players
NK Celje players
NK Drava Ptuj players
Slovenian PrvaLiga players
Slovenian expatriate footballers
Expatriate footballers in Romania
Slovenian expatriate sportspeople in Romania
Liga I players
CS Pandurii Târgu Jiu players
SCM Râmnicu Vâlcea players
ASC Oțelul Galați players
NK Ankaran players
NK Radomlje players
Slovenian Second League players
Expatriate footballers in Italy
Slovenian expatriate sportspeople in Italy
Slovenia youth international footballers
Slovenia under-21 international footballers